Fridolin Anderwert (19 September 1828, in Frauenfeld – 25 December 1880) was a Swiss politician.

He was elected to the Swiss Federal Council on 10 December 1875 and was member of the Council until 25 December 1880. He was affiliated to the Free Democratic Party of Switzerland. 

During his office time he held the Department of Justice and Police and was Vice-President of the Swiss Confederation in 1880. 

On 7 December 1880 he was elected President of the Swiss Confederation for the year 1881. Immediately after the election a nasty campaign against him broke out in the press, in particular about the eating habits of the obese bachelor, but also rumors that he was a regular visitor in gay brothels. Drawn by physical exhaustion and severe depression, Anderwert committed suicide on Christmas Day 1880 on the "Kleine Schanze", a small park next to the Houses of Parliament. The only published sentence of his farewell letter states: "They want a victim, they shall have it."

External links

1828 births
1880 deaths
People from Frauenfeld
Swiss Old Catholics
Free Democratic Party of Switzerland politicians
Members of the Federal Council (Switzerland)
Members of the National Council (Switzerland)
Presidents of the National Council (Switzerland)
Federal Supreme Court of Switzerland judges
Politicians who committed suicide
Suicides by firearm in Switzerland
19th-century Swiss judges